Duet is an American sitcom that aired on Fox from April 19, 1987, to August 20, 1989. Originally, the story centered on the romance of a novelist (Matthew Laurance) and a caterer (Mary Page Keller), but gradually the focus shifted to their yuppie friends (Chris Lemmon, Alison LaPlaca) and the show was rebranded as Open House. The series was created by Ruth Bennett and Susan Seeger, and was produced by Paramount Television.

Synopsis
Ben Coleman is a struggling mystery novelist, while his girlfriend Laura Kelly is a caterer with her younger sister Jane (Jodi Thelen). Richard and Linda Phillips were a high-powered yuppie couple. He was in the family patio-furniture business and she was a studio executive. Linda's boss at World Wide Studios was Cooper Hayden (Larry Poindexter), who eventually became infatuated with Jane. Richard later quit his job to become a professional pianist. Geneva (Arleen Sorkin) was the Phillipses' wisecracking, sexy maid who sometimes fraternized with the sisters.

In the 1987–88 season finale, Linda gave birth to a daughter, Amanda, who grew into a three-year-old (Ginger Orsi) capable of speech by the start of the series' third and final season. When the 1988–89 season began, Ben and Laura had married, and Linda had lost her job at World Wide Studios. Linda then sought a partnership in Laura's catering business. Just prior to the end of that season, Linda met real estate mogul Ted Nichols, played by guest star and LaPlaca's then-boyfriend, Philip Charles MacKenzie. Ted schmoozed her into joining his realty firm, selling upscale properties to snobs just like herself. Shortly after, Fox announced its cancellation of Duet, and with LaPlaca as its breakout star, both she and MacKenzie shared the lead in its spin-off, Open House.

Production
The series was among the first to appear on the Fox network when they launched a Sunday night prime-time TV lineup in 1987, alongside Married... with Children, The Tracey Ullman Show and Mr. President.  Loosely based on the love lives of creators Bennett and Seeger, the show was originally noted for being serialized, with events unfolding in succession from week to week.

Matthew Laurance was the first actor hired, but they couldn't find a leading lady that sparked with him in Los Angeles, so they held auditions in New York, where they finally found Mary Page Keller. Keller and Jodi Thelen met at the audition and had such an instantaneous sisterly rapport that they were both cast within days. Alison LaPlaca was originally hired to appear as the undefined wife of a supporting character in two episodes, but a pregnancy was written into the next script, requiring her to stick around. Acting wasn't Chris Lemmon's primary career goal—he had studied extensively as a pianist—but his musical dreams and abilities were eventually utilized in the show.

There was a period of adjustment as the actors became familiar with one another, but once things began to click, there was a fun atmosphere on the set, and little interference from the network.  Susan Seeger got her whole family into the act, with brother David and their famous father Hal Seeger creating the opening title sequence, sister Mindy portraying Ben's publicist Nina, and sister Charbie Dahl (aka Charlene Seeger) writing a few of the scripts.

Although the first season focused squarely on Ben and Laura, season two became an ensemble with ongoing stories revolving around Jane, Richard, and Linda. As the meaning of the show's title blurred, Fox tried to spin it in promotion claiming, "Duet means two, so why is it about five people, a dog, and a baby? Because it's a show you shouldn't watch alone!" By the third season, Fox executives began forcing changes.  Noticing the popularity of Alison LaPlaca's character, they pushed Ben, Laura, and Jane into the background as stories became exclusively centered on Linda and Richard. They also flashed ahead three years so they could turn the Phillipses daughter into a talking toddler, which was proving popular with audiences on ABC's Full House. The Phillipses also eclipsed the newlywed Colemans in the network's promotion.

The theme music over the opening titles was composed by Buddy Budson, and in the first two seasons performed by Ursula Walker and Tony Franklin.

Beginning in season two, the opening titles changed to begin featuring clips of the characters in scenes from the show. These were book-ended by the show's title appearing in gold on a maroon leather-textured photo album cover, which opened to reveal the series of episode clips, and the photo album closing, with creators Ruth Bennett and Susan Seeger being credited in gold on the album cover. (In season one, the show title was displayed over the beginning of the opening scene.) In season three, the same sequence style remained, but the theme music was rearranged into a complete saxophone/electric guitar instrumental, with the instruments taking the place of the notes sung by vocalists Walker and Franklin.

Cast

Note: * Ben's dog (live animal actor)

Broadcast history

Episode guide

Season 1 (1987)
Note: Many of the titles that appear on-screen differ from those found in TV listings. Only the first season featured on-screen title cards, as well as music-themed names.

Season 2 (1987–1988)

Season 3 (1988–1989)

Reception
The show received a largely positive reception., TV Guide compared it to The Mary Tyler Moore Show, noting that it "manages to balance whimsy and reality." Remarking on the Sunday night schedule, which included a movie-of-the-week on two of the three other broadcast networks, The Houston Post said, "If you are tired of movie after movie on the networks, Duet is for you." The South Florida Sentinel hailed it as Fox's "best series to date", and The Journal News remarked that "producers Ruth Bennett and Susan Seeger choreograph this mating dance beautifully."

Despite good reviews, the show remained ratings-challenged. The Fox network was initially regarded as a joke in Hollywood and ratings weren't published until the second season, which found Duet near the bottom of the yearly TV ratings list in 118th place. The third season didn't fare much better, with it ranking in 104th place.

References

External links
 

1987 American television series debuts
1989 American television series endings
1980s American romantic comedy television series
1980s American sitcoms
English-language television shows
Fox Broadcasting Company original programming
Television series by CBS Studios
Television shows set in Los Angeles
Television series by Ubu Productions